Mill Stream Nature Reserve is a 4.7 hectare Local Nature Reserve in Rushmere St Andrew on the eastern outskirts of Ipswich in Suffolk. It is owned by Suffolk Coastal District Council and managed by the council together with Rushmere St Andrew Parish Council and the Greenways Countryside Project.

This linear site along the banks of a stream also has ponds, wet carr, woodland, wildflower grassland and willow scrub. There are ancient oak trees, and fauna include water voles.

There is access from several roads including Kentwell Close and Euston Avenue.

References

Local Nature Reserves in Suffolk